The 2012–13 Eastern Illinois Panthers men's basketball team represented Eastern Illinois University during the 2012–13 NCAA Division I men's basketball season. The Panthers, led by first year head coach Jay Spoonhour, played their home games at Lantz Arena and were members of the West Division of the Ohio Valley Conference. They finished the season 11–21, 6–10 in OVC play to finish in third place in the West Division. They lost in the first round of the Ohio Valley Conference tournament to Southeast Missouri State.

Roster

Schedule

|-
!colspan=9| Exhibition

|-
!colspan=9| Regular season

|-
!colspan=9| 2013 OVC Basketball tournament

References

Eastern Illinois Panthers men's basketball seasons
Eastern Illinois